D'Iberville Fortier,  (February 5, 1926 – April 22, 2006) was a Canadian diplomat and public servant.

Career
A career diplomat, his service spanned the years 1952 to 1984. During this time, he was the Canadian ambassador to: Libya, Tunisia, Italy, Luxembourg, and Belgium. In addition, he was the High Commissioner to Malta and the Acting Canadian Commissioner at the ICSC for Cambodia. 

From 1984 to 1991, he was the third Commissioner of Official Languages.

In 2000, he was made an Officer of the Order of Canada in recognition of being "a public servant and a diplomat highly respected in the international community".

He was married to Marie-Thérèse Allégret and had two children, Sébastien and Valérie.

References

1926 births
2006 deaths
Ambassadors of Canada to Belgium
Ambassadors of Canada to Cambodia
Ambassadors of Canada to Libya
Ambassadors of Canada to Luxembourg
Ambassadors of Canada to Tunisia
French Quebecers
High Commissioners of Canada to Malta
Officers of the Order of Canada
People from Montreal

Commissioners of Official Languages (Canada)